The Sega Genesis, known as the  in regions outside of North America, is a 16-bit video game console that was developed and sold by Sega. First released in Japan on October 29, 1988, in North America on August 14, 1989 and in PAL regions in 1990, the Genesis is Sega's third console and the successor to the Master System. The system supports a library of  games created both by Sega and a wide array of third-party publishers and delivered on ROM cartridges. It can also play the complete library of Master System games when the separately sold Power Base Converter is installed. The Sega Genesis also sported numerous peripherals, including the Sega CD and Sega 32X, several network services, and multiple first-party and third-party variations of the console that focused on extending its functionality. The console and its games continue to be popular among fans, collectors, video game music fans, and emulation enthusiasts. Licensed third party re-releases of the console are still being produced, and several indie game developers continue to produce games for it. Many games have also been re-released in compilations for newer consoles and offered for download on various digital distribution services, such as Virtual Console, Xbox Live Arcade, PlayStation Network, and Steam.

The Genesis library was initially modest, but eventually grew to contain games to appeal to all types of players. The initial pack-in title was Altered Beast, which was later replaced with Sonic the Hedgehog. Top sellers included Sonic the Hedgehog, its sequel Sonic the Hedgehog 2, and Disney's Aladdin. During development for the console, Sega Enterprises in Japan focused on developing action games while Sega of America was tasked with developing sports games. A large part of the appeal of the Genesis library during the console's lifetime was the arcade-based experience of its games, as well as more difficult entries such as Ecco the Dolphin and sports games such as Joe Montana Football. Compared to its competition, Sega advertised to an older audience by hosting more mature games, including the uncensored version of Mortal Kombat.

This is an alphabetical list of released games for the Sega Genesis. Titles listed do not include releases for the Sega CD and Sega 32X add-ons. Included in this list are titles not licensed by Sega, including releases in Taiwan by several developers such as Gamtec, as well as releases by Accolade before being licensed following the events of Sega v. Accolade. This list also includes titles developed by unlicensed third-party developers after the discontinuation of the Genesis, such as Pier Solar and the Great Architects. Any unlicensed games will have "yes" in the unlicensed column.

A few games were only released exclusively on the Sega Channel subscription service, which was active from 1994 to 1998, in the US. This means that, whilst cartridges were officially released for use on PAL and Japanese consoles, they were unavailable physically in the US. While few games were released this way, some of them are considered to be staples in the Genesis library, such as Pulseman and Mega Man: The Wily Wars.

Licensed games
A total of  licensed game titles are known to have been released for the console:

Sega Meganet titles
Sega Meganet, also known as the Net Work System, was an online service for the Mega Drive in Japan. Utilizing dial-up Internet access, Meganet was Sega's first online multiplayer gaming service, and functioned on a pay to play basis. The system functioned through the use of a peripheral called the Mega Modem and offered several unique titles that could be downloaded, and a few could be played competitively with friends. In addition, it shared technology and equipment with more serious services such as the Mega Anser, used for banking purposes. Though the system was announced for North America under the rebranded name "Tele-Genesis", it was never released for that region.

The Meganet service utilized its own library of titles, independent of the Mega Drive library. Most of these games never received a cartridge release; however, Columns, Flicky, Fatal Labyrinth, and Teddy Boy Blues each later saw cartridge versions. Several Meganet games would also later appear in the Game no Kanzume series, released for the Mega-CD exclusively in Japan. Most games for the service were small, at around 128kB per game, due to the limits of Internet connection speeds at the time. Downloads were estimated to take about five to eight minutes to complete. All of the Meganet games were available through the Sega Game Library, accessed through the Meganet modem. Due to issues with long-distance charges through the use of telephone lines, as well as seconds of lag time between commands, only two games featured competitive play: Tel-Tel Stadium and Tel-Tel Mahjong, with the remainder of the games available for single players via download. Due to Sega's reluctance to commit to releasing the service in North America, third-party developers in that region were unwilling to invest in developing games specifically for Meganet. This resulted in a low number of titles created for the service.

The following list contains all of the titles released for the Meganet service. All titles in this list were released in Japan only.

There were  games on the Meganet.

" * " determines games that also had a physical release

Compilations

Unlicensed games

See also

 List of Sega video game franchises
 List of Sega CD games
 List of Sega 32X games
 List of cancelled games for Sega consoles
 Lists of video games

References

 
Sega Genesis
Genesis